Pannon wine region is one of the seven larger wine regions of Hungary. It consists of four wine regions: Pécs, Szekszárd, Tolna and Villány. Its soil is mostly loess. Wine production started in the Roman ages. Both red and white wines are produced, but the former are more significant. International varieties, especially Cabernet Sauvignon, Cabernet Franc and Merlot have gained ground in the region. The best known product of Szekszárd is Szekszárdi Bikavér, while Villány is known for its full-bodied Bordeaux style red wines.

Wine regions

References 

Wine regions of Hungary